Hsu Yu-hsiou and Benjamin Lock were the defending champions but only Lock chose to defend his title, partnering Grigoriy Lomakin. Lock lost in the semifinals to Andrew Paulson and David Poljak.

Nam Ji-sung and Song Min-kyu won the title after defeating Paulson and Poljak 6–2, 3–6, [10–6] in the final.

Seeds

Draw

References

External links
 Main draw

President's Cup - Men's doubles
2022 Men's doubles